is a Japanese footballer who plays as a midfielder for J2 League club Blaublitz Akita.

Career statistics

Club
.

Notes

Honours
 Blaublitz Akita
 J3 League (1): 2020

References

External links

1997 births
Living people
Japanese footballers
Association football forwards
Biwako Seikei Sport College alumni
J3 League players
Blaublitz Akita players